The Battle of Aghaiani took place in 1625, between Kakhetian and Safavid armies. In early spring, Shah Abbas I sent a large army under the command of Qarachaqay Khan to Georgia. The mission of this expedition was to annihilate the Kakhetians and exile the survivors to Iran. The Persian army set up camp near the village of Aghaiani and Commander Qarciha-Khan invited Kakhetian noblemen (Tavadi and Aznauri) with the intention to award them. However, upon entering the tents to get the "gifts" they were slaughtered. After executing almost 400 people, the real intention of the Iranians was revealed. Surviving Kakhetian noblemen fought their way, escaped from the camp and started preparing rebellion in Kartli and Kakheti against Iranians.

See also
Battle of Martqopi

Sources
 GSE, (1977) volume 2, page 47, Tbilisi.

Aghaiani
1625 in Europe
1625 in Asia
17th century in Georgia (country)
17th century in Iran
Aghaiani
Aghaiani